Petir LRT station is an elevated Light Rail Transit (LRT) station on the Bukit Panjang LRT line in Bukit Panjang, Singapore, located at the junction of Petir Road and Gangsa Road.

Etymology
This station is located along Petir Road. Petir means "lightning" in Malay.

References

External links

Railway stations in Singapore opened in 1999
Bukit Panjang
LRT stations of Bukit Panjang LRT Line
Light Rail Transit (Singapore) stations